Tshane is a village in Kgalagadi District of Botswana. It is situated in Kalahari Desert, and is served by local Tshane Airport. The village has a primary school and the population was 1020 in 2011 census. It has a !Xóõ cultural centre.

Around Tshane there are large villages like Lehututu, Hukuntsi and Lokwabe. The most populated place is Lehututu with two primary schools, secondary and Matcheng Bridgate school. Almost all tourists visit Lehututu for accommodation and leisure as there is a hotel with a night club.

References

Kgalagadi District
Villages in Botswana